Red Exposure is the fourth studio album by American experimental rock band Chrome. It was released on April 5, 1980 by Beggars Banquet Records.

Track listing

Personnel 
 Chrome

 Helios Creed – vocals, guitar synthesizer, bowed guitar, synthesizer, drum machine, bass guitar, production
 Damon Edge – vocals, synthesizer, guitar synthesizer, tape operation, drum machine, production, mixing, mastering

 Technical

 John L. Cyborg – engineering
 John Dent – mastering
 Oliver Dicicco – technical assistance
 Malti Kidia – cover artwork
 Tony Escott – cover artwork
 Ian Turner – cover photography

References

External links 

 

1980 albums
Beggars Banquet Records albums
Chrome (band) albums